Billy Morgan may refer to:

Billy Morgan (Gaelic footballer) (born 1945), Gaelic football player and manager with Cork GAA
Billy Morgan (footballer, born 1878) (1878–1939), English football player for Newton Heath, Manchester United, Bolton Wanderers, Watford and Leicester
Billy Morgan (footballer, born 1891), English football player for Birmingham, Coventry City and Crystal Palace
Billy Morgan (footballer, born 1896) (1896–1993), English football player
Billy Morgan (snowboarder) (born 1989), British snowboarder

See also
Bill Morgan (disambiguation)
William Morgan (disambiguation)